Kitkatla Water Aerodrome  is adjacent to Kitkatla, British Columbia, Canada. It is for use of float planes.

References

Seaplane bases in British Columbia
North Coast Regional District
Registered aerodromes in British Columbia